is a short-episode original net anime series by Yokohama Animation Laboratory, which aired from May 11 to July 27, 2019. It is based on a series of illustrations by Japanese artist Yomu.

Plot
The first morning of the new semester is rainy, with cherry blossoms falling onto the puddles. The students of Yaegasumi High School enter the school gate with various colors of umbrellas. In front of the shoe locker, Yua starts chatting with her friend, Ren Aikawa, whose tights got wet from the rain. Homi, who was drenched, joined them pretending she was jumping. The new semester begins with the girls doing seemingly normal things, while heavily pandering to foot fetishists.

Characters

A normal second year high school student who tries to act cool, but is also shy and finds it hard to refuse the requests of others. She is 162 cm tall and wears 60 denier tights. She works part-time as a waitress at a family restaurant. 

An honor student good at studies and sports. She's not talkative, but she is a good communicator and also likes to tease Ren. She enjoys taking selfies and pictures of herself and posting them on social media; she is a well-known cosplayer. She is 168 cm tall and wears 30 denier tights.

A bright and bubbly student who often surprises Ren and Yua. She is driven to school and is a member of the swimming club. In episode 10, it is shown she has a brother in junior high school. She is 158 cm tall and wears 110 denier tights.

A 27-year-old homeroom teacher (for Ren's class) who is popular among the students. She is passionate about teaching and guiding her students, but can sometimes be overzealous. In episode 7, it is revealed that Yuiko has a hidden seductive side, as she seduces one of her male students (By giving him a heavily implied footjob) in an attempt to get him to obey her.

Media

Anime
Miru Tights was streamed on YouTube worldwide outside of Japan in English and Chinese subtitles. The ending theme is "True Days", with Haruka Tomatsu, Yōko Hikasa and Aya Suzaki each performing a version as their respective characters. A bonus episode is included with the series' Blu-ray, which was released on August 23, 2019.

Episode list

Video game 
A puzzle game entitled  was released on iOS, Nintendo Switch, and Android on April 22, 2021.

See also
 Ganbare Doukichan, a web manga also done by Yomu

References

External links
  
 

2019 anime ONAs
2021 video games
Android (operating system) games
Anime with original screenplays
Japan-exclusive video games
Nintendo Switch games
Puzzle video games
Video games based on anime and manga
Yokohama Animation Laboratory